Joseph Hartnett (1927 – 18 October 2005) was an Irish hurler and Gaelic footballer, who usually played as a centre-forward, and is best known as a dual player with the Cork senior teams.

References

1927 births
2005 deaths
All-Ireland Senior Hurling Championship winners
Cork inter-county hurlers
Cork inter-county Gaelic footballers
Dual players
Glen Rovers hurlers
Munster inter-provincial hurlers
St Nicholas' Gaelic footballers